Stephen Byrne is the name of:

 Stephen Byrne (broadcaster) (born 1990), Irish vlogger and television personality
 Stephen Byrne (comics) (born 1986), Irish artist and animator
 Stephen Byrne (hurler) (born 1977), Irish hurler

See also
Steve Byrne (born 1974), American stand-up comedian and actor
Steve Byrnes (1959–2015), American television announcer and producer
Steve Byrne, member of Scottish folk band Malinky
Steve Byrne, member of English new wave band Freeze Frame
 Stephen Burns (disambiguation)